Teuku Wisnu (born March 4, 1985) is an Indonesian actor, singer, and presenter of Aceh descent. He is the son-in-law of Indonesian actors Fanny Bauty and Mark Sungkar.

Filmography

Film 
 Gue Kapok Jatuh Cinta (2005)
 Lentera Merah (2006)
 Suka Ma Suka (2009)

Television 
 Makin Sayang
 Benar Benar Cinta
 Cinta Fitri (seasons 1–7)
 Ranum
 Zahra

Discography 
 Cintaku Adalah Takdirmu (feat. Indah Dewi Pertiwi)
 Cinta Kita (feat. Shireen Sungkar)
 Indonesia Raya (feat. Shireen Sungkar)
 Dia Yang Ku Minta
 Syukur

Awards and nominations 
 Favorite Actor (Panasonic Awards 2009)
 Nominator Favorite Actor (Panasonic Gobel Awards 2010 and Panasonic Gobel Awards 2011)
 Favorite Actor (Indonesia Kids Choice Awards 2008)
 Favorite Actor (Indonesia Kids Choice Awards 2009)
 Favorite Actor (Indonesia Kids Choice Awards 2010)
 Favorite Actor (Indonesia Kids Choice Awards 2011])
 Aktor Ngetop (SCTV Awards 2007, 2008, 2009, and 2010)

References 

1985 births
Living people
Indonesian male television actors
21st-century Indonesian male singers
Indonesian pop singers
Acehnese people
Indonesian Muslims
Musicians from Jakarta
Anugerah Musik Indonesia winners